Events from the year 1644 in Ireland.

Incumbent
Monarch: Charles I

Events
October 24 – the Long Parliament of England passes an Ordinance of no quarter to the Irish.

Births
Richard Pyne, judge (d. 1709)

Deaths
May 26 – Roche MacGeoghegan, Dominican Bishop of Kildare (b. 1580)
September 7 – Ralph Corbie, Jesuit priest (b. 1598) (hanged)
September 13 – Peter Wadding, Jesuit theologian (b. c.1581)
 December – Michael Wadding, Jesuit priest and missionary to New Spain (b. 1591)
 Geoffrey Keating (Seathrún Céitinn), historian (b. c.1569)

References

1640s in Ireland
Years of the 17th century in Ireland